Birabenella is a genus of spiders in the family Oonopidae. It was first described in 2010 by Grismado.

Species 
 it contains seven species, found in South America:

 Birabenella argentina (Birabén, 1955) – Argentina
 Birabenella chincha Piacentini, Grismado & Ramírez, 2017 – Peru
 Birabenella elqui Grismado, 2010 – Chile
 Birabenella homonota Grismado, 2010 (type) – Chile
 Birabenella kamanchaca Piacentini, Grismado & Ramírez, 2017 – Chile
 Birabenella pizarroi Grismado, 2010 – Chile
 Birabenella portai Piacentini, Grismado & Ramírez, 2017 – Argentina

References

Oonopidae
Araneomorphae genera
Spiders of South America